The Lindner Hotels & Resorts is a family-owned hotel company with headquarters in Düsseldorf. They have 32 hotels with 4,760 rooms and employs 2,000 people. At the end of 2010, the hotel group made a turnover of € 165.7 million.

External links 
 Official website (English)
 UK team using Lindner Congress Düsseldorf as a base for their 2012 tour

Companies based in Düsseldorf
Hotel and leisure companies of Germany